Shelly R. Peyton is an American chemist who is the Armstrong Professional Development Professor at the University of Massachusetts Amherst. Her research considers the development of biomaterials to investigate metastatic cancer and potential new therapies.

Early life and education 
Peyton was an undergraduate student at Northwestern University, where she majored in chemical engineering. She was a member of the ultimate frisbee team. Peyton moved to the University of California, Irvine, where she worked on tissue engineering for the cardiovascular system in the research group of Andy Putnam. Peyton moved to the Massachusetts Institute of Technology where she was appointed a National Institutes of Health Ruth L. Kirschstein Postdoctoral Fellow. At MIT, Peyton was trained in stem cell biology by Linda Griffith. Together they investigated mesenchymal stem cell migration.

Research and career 
In 2011, Peyton joined the University of Massachusetts Amherst, where she established a research program in the design and application of biomaterials. She was made the Barry and Afsaneh Siadat Career Development Fellow in 2012. 

Peyton investigated the fundamental mechanisms that underpin metastasis through the engineering of carefully controlled environments. The series of events includes crosstalk between stem cells and tumours, the mobilization of stem cells, the reassembly of pre-metastatic tissue and the movement of circulating stem cells to tissue sites.  In particular, Peyton is interested in the role of stem cells in the metastatic spread of breast cancer. She argued that the stem cells remodel the target organ, altering the mechanical properties of the organ before the cancer cells attack. The controlled environments created by Peyton mimic human organs, allowing Peyton to study how cancer cells embedded in these artificial tissues respond to different forms of chemotherapy. Specifically, the three-dimensional tumour spheroids allow Peyton to precisely control and study the response of biological tissue to cancer cells and therapies.

Peyton worked with Sandra Petersen to develop the Postbaccalaureate Research Education Program (PREP), a $1.7 million National Science Foundation program that looks to improve diversity in the biomedical workforce. In particular, PREP provides funding to doctoral students from historically marginalized groups.

Awards and honors 
 2013 National Institutes of Health New Innovator Award
 2013 Pew Biomedical Scholar 
 2015 Cellular and Molecular Bioengineering Young Innovator Award
 2015 National Science Foundation CAREER Award
 2018 Purdue University Mellichamp Lecture

Selected publications

Personal life 
Peyton married her wife in 2016. Peyton is involved with various initiatives to support LGBTQIA+ researchers at the University of Massachusetts Amherst and Biomedical Engineering Society, and was encouraged to do so by Naomi Chesler.

References 

Living people
Year of birth missing (living people)
American LGBT scientists
University of Massachusetts Amherst faculty
Northwestern University alumni
Massachusetts Institute of Technology people
University of California, Irvine alumni
Biomedical engineers